"Like Lovers Do" is a 2014 song by Madeline Juno.

Like Lovers Do may also refer to:

 "Like Lovers Do" (Lloyd Cole song), 1995
 "Like Lovers Do", a song by Roxette on the 1986 album Pearls of Passion
 "Like Lovers Do", a song by Heather Nova on the 2011 album South
 "Like Lovers Do", a song by Hey Violet on the 2017 album From the Outside
 "Like Lovers Do", a single by Jude Cole from her 1987 self-titled album

See also
 "What Lovers Do", a 2017 single by Maroon 5 featuring SZA